Magnus Joneby (born 1 December 1984) is a Swedish Bandy player who currently plays for Västerås SK as a half back.  Magnus is a youth product of Västerås SK where he has remained through his career so far.  Magnus made his first team debut in the 2002/03 season.

External links
 Magnus joneby at bandysidan

Swedish bandy players
Living people
1984 births
Västerås SK Bandy players
Place of birth missing (living people)